Saint-Augustin Airport  is located on the shore of the Rivière Saint-Augustin near Saint-Augustin and Pakuashipi, Quebec, Canada.

Airlines and destinations

References

Certified airports in Côte-Nord